Krzysztof Kuszewski (19 July 1940 – 8 February 2022) was a Polish politician. He served as Minister of Health and Social Welfare from 17 September to 17 October 1997. He died on 8 February 2022 at the age of 81.

References

1940 births
2022 deaths
20th-century Polish politicians
Polish epidemiologists
Health ministers of Poland
Academic staff of the Medical University of Łódź
People from Opatów